AVM may refer to:

Arteriovenous malformation, a congenital disorder of the veins and arteries that make up the vascular system
Cerebral arteriovenous malformation, an abnormal connection of the veins and arteries in the brain
Acute viral meningitis, inflammation of the protective membranes covering the brain and spinal cord, caused by a viral infection
Air Vice-Marshal, a rank in the United Kingdom and many Commonwealth air forces
Associação Visão de Macau or Vision Macau, a political party in Macao
AVM GmbH, a German manufacturer of broadband modems and consumer networking devices
Astronomy Visualization Metadata, a standard for tagging digital astronomical images with astronomical information
ActionScript Virtual Machine, a component of Adobe Flash Player
Adarsha Vidya Mandir, a school in Lalitpur, Nepal
MetroCity AVM, a modern shopping mall in Istanbul, Turkey
AVM Productions, a film production house in Tamil Nadu, India
Automated Valuation Model, a mathematical model for analysis of residential property
Attribute value matrix, a compact notation in linguistics for listing attribute-value pairs describing a lexical entity
Adaptive Vehicle Make, a United States military project to design and manufacture defense systems and vehicles
AVM Runestone, an archaeological forgery found in 2001 near Kensington, Minnesota
Avian Vacuolar Myelinopathy, a fatal neurological disease
Automatic vehicle monitoring, one of the applications of vehicle tracking systems